Qeshlaq-e Esmail Khan may refer to:
 Qeshlaq-e Esmail Khan, Parsabad
 Qeshlaq-e Esmail Khan Jalil Ranjaber, Bileh Savar County
 Qeshlaq-e Esmail Khan Mohammad Izadi, Bileh Savar County